The Korean International School in Beijing (KISB) is an international school in Wangjing, Chaoyang District, Beijing. It serves grades 1–12. It has instruction in Korean, Chinese, and English.

The school was established on December 19, 1996, as the Beijing Korean Kindergarten (北京韩国幼儿园). It received its current name on December 19, 2000.

It was previously located in Changping District.

See also
 Korean people in Beijing
 Shanghai Korean School

References

External links

 Korean International School in Beijing
 Korean International School in Beijing 

Schools in Chaoyang District, Beijing
Beijing
International schools in Beijing
High schools in Beijing